Eastern Wind is singer/songwriter Chris de Burgh's fifth studio album, released in 1980.  It did not make the UK Albums Chart or Billboard 200, but was at the time the second best-selling album in Norway after Abbey Road by the Beatles.

Track listing
All songs written by Chris de Burgh
"The Traveller" – 4:11
"The Record Company Bash" – 3:54
"Tonight" – 3:28
"Wall of Silence" – 3:48
"Flying Home" – 3:59
"Shadows and Lights" – 3:11
"Sailor" – 4:15
"Some Things Never Change" – 3:14
"Tourist Attraction" – 3:09
"Eastern Wind" – 5:17

Personnel 
 Chris de Burgh – lead and harmony vocals, acoustic guitar, 12-string acoustic guitar
 Tim Wynveen – acoustic guitar, electric guitar, harmony vocals
 Al Marnie – bass, harmony vocals
 Glenn Morrow – keyboards, synthesizers
 Erik Robertson – acoustic piano (3, 7), organ (3, 7)
 Jeff Phillips – drums, percussion
 Dick Heckstall-Smith – percussion (6, 8, 9)
 John Anthony Helliwell – saxophone
 Lisa Dal Bello – backing vocals (2, 5, 8)
 Colina Phillips – backing vocals (6, 8)
 Sharon Lee Williams – backing vocals (6, 8)

Production 
 Producer – David Anderle
 Assistant Producer – Kenny Thomson
 Engineer – Hayward Parrott
 Assistant Engineer – David Taylor
 Recorded at Manta Sound Studios, Toronto.
 Art Direction and Photography – Michael Ross
 Illustration – Allan Manham
 Management – Mismanagement, Inc.

References

Chris de Burgh albums
1980 albums
Albums produced by David Anderle
A&M Records albums